The 2013 Shell-Pennzoil Grand Prix of Houston was the third and final doubleheader of the 2013 IndyCar Series season. The races took place on October 5 and 6, 2013.

Report
The starting scene of race 1 was a crash involving James Hinchcliffe and Ed Carpenter after Hinchcliffe's car suffered stall. The first race was won by Scott Dixon, who finished second to Team Penske driver Will Power in the second race. The second race was also notable for an accident on the final lap involving Dario Franchitti, E. J. Viso, and Takuma Sato. Franchitti suffered major injuries in the crash, and was forced to retire from racing due to the severity of the injuries he sustained.

References

2013 in IndyCar
2013 in sports in Texas
October 2013 sports events in the United States
2013